Noel King is a co-host and editorial director of the podcast and radio show Today Explained for Vox. She is a graduate of Brown University, and comes from Kerhonkson, New York. King began working in radio in 2004 in Khartoum as a freelance journalist for the Voice of America. She also worked for Public Radio International's The World, and was a correspondent for the Planet Money podcast.  From 2018 through 2021, King was a host of NPR's Morning Edition and Up First.

Awards
In October 2020, King was awarded the "One To Watch" award from radiohalloffame.com.

References

External links
NPR biography
Noel King on Twitter
Minnesota Public Radio interview with Noel King

Living people
Year of birth missing (living people)
American radio journalists
NPR personalities
Brown University alumni